Rastislav Gašpar (born 13 October 1994) is a Slovak professional ice hockey player who is currently playing for HC '05 Banská Bystrica of the Slovak Extraliga. . 

Gašpar previously played in Slovak Extraliga for Detva. On November 5, 2020, Gašpar moved to another team in Slovakia. He signed for HC Slovan Bratislava a multi-year contract valid until 30 April 2022 and with the possibility of another option until April 2023.

Career statistics

Regular season and playoffs

Awards and honors

References

External links
 

1994 births
Living people
Sportspeople from Banská Bystrica
Slovak ice hockey centres
HC 07 Detva players
HC '05 Banská Bystrica players
HK 36 Skalica players
HC Slovan Bratislava players